Morgan Hill is a suburban unincorporated community and census-designated place (CDP) in Northampton County, Pennsylvania. It was first listed as a CDP prior to the 2020 census. As of the 2020 census, its population was 1,034.  Morgan Hill is part of the Lehigh Valley metropolitan area, which had a population of 861,899 and was thus the 68th most populous metropolitan area in the U.S. as of the 2020 census.

Morgan Hill is located in southeastern Northampton County, in the northeastern part of Williams Township. The eastern part of the community is occupied by Morgan Hill Golf Course and associated housing.

Morgan Hill Road crosses the center of the CDP, leading north into Easton and southwest into Stouts Valley. Interstate 78 passes just north of the CDP, running along the base of the hill, and providing access via Exit 75 at Morgan Hill Road. I-78 leads west  to the west side of Allentown and east  to Clinton, New Jersey and terminates at the Holland Tunnel's entrance to Lower Manhattan.

References 

Census-designated places in Northampton County, Pennsylvania
Census-designated places in Pennsylvania